Thighs and Whispers is the fifth studio album by American singer Bette Midler. Released in 1979, the album reached #65 on the Billboard Pop Albums chart.

Production and release
The album was largely disco-influenced. It saw Midler reunite with producer Arif Mardin and includes Jerry Ragovoy's "My Knight in Black Leather", a minor dance-floor hit that peaked at #70 on the US dance charts. "Married Men", "Hang on in There Baby" and "My Knight in Black Leather", released at the height of the disco era, were all issued as extended mixes on 12-inch singles. The album's title is a humorous play on Cries and Whispers, influential Swedish film-maker Ingmar Bergman's 1973 movie.

The song "Millworker", written by James Taylor, is from the short-lived Broadway production of Working. Midler's recording of "Married Men" reached the top 40 of the U.S. Club Play Singles chart. The song was also a UK top 40 hit for Bonnie Tyler the same year. Tyler's version was the theme to the British film The World Is Full of Married Men.

While the singles and the album itself were largely overlooked at the time, "Big Noise From Winnetka" has since served as the opening number on many of Midler's tours. The song was originally a swing classic recorded by Bob Crosby and the Bobcats, Gene Krupa and several others in the late 1930s.

The album was released on CD in 1990. A remastered version of the album was released by Atlantic Records/Warner Music in 1995.

Critical reception

The album received mixed reviews from music critics. Joe Viglione from AllMusic website gave the album two out five stars and wrote that despite Midler being in fine voice and is "such a consistent and dynamic artist" the release is "an uneven album" but "still has its moments". Robert Christgau gave the album a C+ and wrote a humorous review in which he wrote that "the songs are pretty good, and when you listen up they get better" but conclude that "the songs aren't that good. And they don't get that much better." Stephen Holden from Rolling Stone magazine wrote that the album "is the most convincing proof yet that Bette Midler is a stage personality in the tradition of Ethel Merman and Liza Minnelli, entertainers whose talents can't be captured in a recording studio either."

Track listing
Side one
"Big Noise from Winnetka" (Ray Bauduc, Bob Crosby, Bob Haggart, Gil Rodin) – 6:56
"Millworker" (James Taylor) – 4:07
"Cradle Days" (Tony Berg, Aaron Neville) – 5:05
"My Knight in Black Leather" (Jerry Ragovoy) – 4:53

Side two
"Hang on in There Baby" (Johnny Bristol) – 6:04
"Hurricane" (Randy Kerber, Bette Midler) – 7:30
"Rain" (Mac Rebennack) – 3:58
"Married Men" (Dominic Bugatti, Frank Musker) – 3:47

Personnel

Jonathan Abramowitz – strings
Lamar Alsop – whistling
Phillip Ballou – background vocals
Errol "Crusher" Bennett – percussion, congas
Warren Bernhardt – piano, electric piano
Phil Bodner – clarinet, reeds, saxophone
Michael Brecker – reeds, saxophone, tenor saxophone
Randy Brecker – trumpet
Eddie Brigati – background vocals
Joe Caro – guitar, electric guitar
Robin Clark – background vocals
William Coupon – photography
Rafael Cruz – percussion
Eddie Daniels – reeds, saxophone, alto saxophone
Lew DelGatto – reeds, saxophone
Jimmy Douglass – engineer
Jon Faddis – trumpet
Steve Ferrone – drums
Sammy Figueroa – percussion
Babi Floyd – background vocals
Arthur Freeman – background vocals
John Frosk – trumpet
John Gale – trombone
Billy Gray – background vocals
Diva Gray – background vocals, obbligato vocals
Robin Grean – background vocals
Lewis Hahn – engineer, mixing
Carl Hall – background vocals
Ula Hedwig – background vocals
Stephen Innocenzi – remixing
Anthony Jackson – bass
Arthur Jenkins – electric piano
Jack Jennings – percussion, marimba, background vocals
Randy Kerber – synthesizer, piano, electric piano, mellotron
Will Lee – bass
Bernie Leighton – piano
Jesse Levy – cello
Mel Lewis – drums, tom-tom
Tom "Bones" Malone – trombone
Arif Mardin – producer, percussion, conductor, horn arrangements
George Marge – reeds, saxophone
Jim Maxwell – bagpipes
Bette Midler – vocals, background vocals
Merle Miller – background vocals
Jeff Mironov – guitar
Michael O'Reilly – assistant engineer
Gene Orloff – concertmaster
Gene Pau – engineer
Jerry Ragovoy – producer
Katey Sagal - background vocals
Marc Shaiman – vocal arrangement
Jocelyn Shaw – background vocals
Alan Shulman – strings
Billy Slapin – reeds, saxophone
David Spinozza – acoustic guitar, guitar
Danny Stiles – trumpet
Richard Tee – piano
Fonzi Thornton – background vocals
David Tofani – reeds, saxophone
Luther Vandross – background vocals
Ed Walsh – synthesizer
Bobby Warner – engineer
Willie Weeks – bass
Frank Wess – reeds, saxophone
Ken Williams – bass vocals
George Young – reeds, saxophone
Sandi Young – art direction
Albert Izzo - drums
Peter Ballin - saxophone

Chart performance

Album

Release history

Notes

1979 albums
Bette Midler albums
Albums produced by Arif Mardin
Atlantic Records albums